Luigi Amoroso (26 March 1886 – 28 October 1965) was an Italian neoclassical economist influenced by Vilfredo Pareto. He provided support for and influenced the economic policy during the fascist regime.

Work
The microeconomical concept of the Amoroso–Robinson relation is named after him (and Joan Robinson): according to paper  he is one of the first economists to have studied the dynamical equilibrium theory by using an analogy between economic systems and classical mechanics, thus applying to theories of economical behaviour mathematical tools as the calculus of variation. In his young years he contributed to the theory of functions of several complex variables, giving for the first time a set of necessary and sufficient conditions for the solvability of the Dirichlet problem for holomorphic functions of several variables in the paper . Also, in 1927 he provided to his former Normale schoolfellow Mauro Picone the funding for the creation of the Istituto Nazionale per le Applicazioni del Calcolo, now called Istituto per le Applicazioni del Calcolo "Mauro Picone" by means of a local bank.

Selected works

Mathematics
 . "On a boundary value problem" (English translation of title) is the first paper where a set of (fairly complicate) necessary and sufficient conditions for the solvability of the Dirichlet problem for holomorphic functions of several variables is given.

See also 
 Amoroso–Robinson relation
 Vilfredo Pareto
 Mauro Picone
 Joan Robinson
 Several complex variables

Notes

References

Biographical and general references

. The preprint version of the original paper is downloadable from the author's academic web page.
.
.

Scientific references

1886 births
1965 deaths
Italian economists
20th-century Italian mathematicians
Fellows of the Econometric Society